Powder River may refer to:

Places
 Powder River (Wyoming and Montana), in Wyoming and Montana in the United States
 Powder River Country, the area around the above river
  Powder River (Oregon), in Oregon in the United States
 Powder River Basin, a major coal-producing region in the United States
 Powder River Pass, a mountain pass in the Big Horn Mountains of Wyoming
 Powder River County, Montana
 Powder River, Wyoming, a populated place in Natrona County

Events

 Powder River Expedition (1865), refers to two military expeditions through the Powder River region
 Battle of Powder River, a military battle fought during the Black Hills War
 Powder River pass, a football play in 1954 giving Arkansas a 6-0 win over Ole Miss

Transportation

 USS LSM(R)-519, renamed Powder River in 1955

Entertainment

 Powder River (film), a 1953 American Western directed by Louis King
 Powder River (radio), an American radio drama series
 Powder River, a 1989 album by Chris LeDoux